Lalomanu is a village on the east coast of Upolu island in Samoa.The village is part of the electoral constituency (Faipule District) Aleipata Itupa i Luga which is within the larger political district of Atua. It has a population of 712.

The white sandy seaside is called Lalomanu Beach, one of the most popular beaches in Samoa with beach fale accommodation run by locals, including Litia Sini Beach Resort and Taufua Beach Fales, for tourists and visitors. The beach has rich coral lagoons and one of the best views in Samoa. From the beach one can view the uninhabited Nu'utele Island, off the coast from the village. There are activities like snorkeling and sea kayaks available in the area. A beautiful church of the Congregational Christian Church of Samoa is located in the center of the village. The intricate patterns of the previous sanctuary's ceiling was kept intact with supporting mounts while the new sanctuary was built around it, then it was lowered in place.

Lalomanu is approximately 1 hour and 15 minutes drive from the Apia, the country's capital.

The village is the base of the Ao o Atua, Tui Atua fa'anofonofo. Leifi-le-Taua is the son of Lufasiaitu, mentioned in the old tale of Lu and his sacred hens, Samoa. The title is approximately 2,000 years old and has over 75 generations of title holders till today.

2009 Samoa tsunami

Lalomanu was heavily damaged in the 2009 Samoa tsunami with fatalities  following an earthquake south of the Samoa Islands on 29 September 2009. However, the village has slowly recovered in a rebuilding programme with international aid and support.

See also
Archaeology in Samoa

References

External links
www.lalomanuvillage.ws

Populated places in Atua (district)